Lieutenant Colonel Alfred Stowell Jones, VC (24 January 1832 – 29 May 1920) was an English recipient of the Victoria Cross, the highest and most prestigious award for gallantry in the face of the enemy that can be awarded to British and Commonwealth forces.

Early life
Jones was the son of the Archdeacon John Jones. He was educated at Liverpool College and Sandhurst and entered the 9th Lancers in 1852.

Details on the Victoria Cross
Jones was 25 years old, and a lieutenant in the 9th Lancers, British Army during the Indian Mutiny when the following deed on 8 June 1857 at Delhi, India took place for which he was awarded the VC:

Later life
Throughout the siege of Delhi he served as DAQMG to the cavalry and was mentioned in despatches three times and promoted Captain and Brevet-Major. After graduating from Staff College in 1861 he served on the Staff at the Cape 1861–67. He retired in 1872 with the rank of lieutenant colonel.

After retiring from the military Jones became an environmental engineer and won a prize from the Royal Agricultural Society for best managed sewage farm.

He lived at Ridge Cottage, Finchampstead, Berkshire. He died there, aged 88, on 29 May 1920 and is buried in the churchyard of St James in the village.

Family
Among his children were:
Owen Jones, a lieutenant in the Royal Naval Reserve, married in 1902 Lillian Stevenson.
Percy Jones, married in 1902 Olive Mary Edgar Clark, daughter of Major-General Edgar Clark, of the Bengal Staff Corps.

References

Sources
Location of grave and VC medal (Berkshire)
Liverpool VCs (James Murphy, Pen and Sword Books, 2008)

9th Queen's Royal Lancers officers
1832 births
1920 deaths
People educated at Liverpool College
People from Finchampstead
British recipients of the Victoria Cross
Indian Rebellion of 1857 recipients of the Victoria Cross
Graduates of the Royal Military College, Sandhurst
Victoria Cross awardees from Liverpool
18th Royal Hussars officers
Somerset Light Infantry officers
Environmental engineers
English civil engineers
British Army recipients of the Victoria Cross
Burials in Berkshire